The Uleiellaceae are a family of smut fungi in the order Ustilaginomycetes. The family contains the single genus Uleiella, which has two species.

The genus was circumscribed by Joseph Schröter in Hedwigia vol.33 Beibl.: 65 in 1894.

The genus name of Uleiella is in honour of Ernst Heinrich Georg Ule (1854–1915), who was a German botanist and plant collector.

Species
As accepted by Species Fungorum;
 Uleiella chilensis 
 Uleiella paradoxa

References

External links

Ustilaginomycotina
Fungus families
Taxa described in 2001